Muhamed Mustafić (born April 6, 1981 in Rogatica) is a Bosnian professional handballer. Currently, he plays in North Cyprus for Turkish Handball Super League team S.K Besaparmak.

References

http://www.eurohandball.com/ec/ehfc/men/2007-08/player/507635/MuhamedMustafic

1981 births
Living people
Bosnia and Herzegovina male  handball players
People from Rogatica